John Whitelegg is visiting Professor of Sustainable Transport at Liverpool John Moores University and Professor of Sustainable Development at University of York's Stockholm Environment Institute.

Academic career
From 1990 to 1993 Dr. Whitelegg was head of department of geography at Lancaster University and director of the university's Environmental Epidemiology Research Unit. He has written books and over 50 papers, including Transport for a Sustainable Society: the Case for Europe (John Wiley, 1993) and Critical Mass: Transport, Environment and Society in the 21st Century (Pluto Press, 1997), and is founder and editor of the Journal of World Transport Policy & Practice.

Managing Director of Eco-Logica Limited and Fellow of the Royal Society for the Encouragement of Arts, Manufactures and Commerce. Research interests encompass transport and the environment, definition of sustainable transport systems and a sustainable built environment, development of transport in third world cities focusing on Calcutta and the relationships between sustainability and human health, implementation of environmental strategies within manufacturing and service industry and development of environmental management standards. Discipline: Transport, Planning & Housing.

Politics
Whitelegg wrote a report into the carbon emissions of the two parliament system in Europe for the then MEP Caroline Lucas of the Green Party.

He was from 2003 to May 2011 a Green Party local councillor in Lancaster. He stood down in Bulk Ward and his successor held the ward for the Green Party. He is a former chair of the North West (of England) Green Party. He has been the Green Party's Sustainable Development Spokesperson.

Books
 Hillman, M., Adams, J. and Whitelegg, J. (1990) One False Move: A Study of Children's Independent Mobility Policy Studies Institute, London. 
 Whitelegg, J. (editor) (1992) Traffic Congestion: Is There a Way Out? Leading Edge Press, Hawes, Yorkshire 
 Whitelegg, J. Hulten, S. and Flink, T. (eds) (1993) High Speed Trains: fast tracks to the future Leading Edge Press, Hawes, Yorkshire 
 Whitelegg, J. (1993) Transport for a Sustainable Future: the case for Europe Belhaven, London. 
 Whitelegg, J. (1997) Critical Mass: Transport Environment and Society in the Twenty-first Century Pluto Press, London. 
 Nick Williams, Maf Smith and John Whitelegg (1998) Greening the Built Environment Earthscan, London.
 Whitelegg, J. and Gary Haq. (eds) (2003) The Earthscan Reader in World Transport Policy and Practice Earthscan, London.

References

External links
 Eco-Logica Homepage
 Journal World Transport Policy & Practice Homepage
 Stockholm Environment Institute biography of Whitelegg

British environmentalists
Living people
Green Party of England and Wales politicians
Academics of Liverpool John Moores University
Academics of Lancaster University
Year of birth missing (living people)
Sustainable transport pioneers